Tuks may refer to:
 Tuks Senganga, South African rapper
 a colloquial name for the University of Pretoria

See also
 Tuk (disambiguation)